Bis(trimethylsilyl)acetylene (BTMSA) is an organosilicon compound with the formula Me3SiC≡CSiMe3 (Me = methyl). It is a colorless liquid that is soluble in organic solvents. This compound is used as a surrogate for acetylene.

BTMSA is prepared by treating acetylene with butyl lithium followed by addition of chlorotrimethylsilane:
Li2C2  +  2 Me3SiCl  →   Me3SiC≡CSiMe3  +  2 LiCl

Applications 
BTMSA is used as a nucleophile in Friedel-Crafts type acylations and alkylations and a precursor to lithium trimethylsilylacetylide. The TMS groups can be removed with tetra-n-butylammonium fluoride (TBAF) and replaced with protons.  BTMSA is also a useful reagent in cycloaddition reactions. Illustrating its versatility, BTMSA was used in a concise total synthesis of (±)-estrone. A key step in this synthesis was the formation of the steroidal skeleton, catalyzed by CpCo(CO)2.

BTMSA also serves as a ligand in organometallic chemistry. For example, it forms stable adducts with metallocenes.
 Cp2TiCl2 + Mg + Me3SiC≡CSiMe3 → Cp2Ti[(CSiMe3)2] + MgCl2

BTMSA is also used in the total synthesis of epibatidine (and analogs), and also in the synthesis of iclaprim.

References 

Alkyne derivatives
Trimethylsilyl compounds